Medea is a melodrama in one act with five scenes by Bohemian composer Georg Benda with a German libretto by Friedrich Wilhelm Gotter. The work was first performed in Leipzig at the Theater am Rannstädtertor on 1 May 1775.

Historical impact and musical analysis
Medea is considered to be one of Benda's best works and the composition had a significant impact on other composers of the late 18th century by popularizing the emerging genre of melodrama. Among those inspired by the work are Carl Philipp Emanuel Bach and Wolfgang Amadeus Mozart. Mozart in a letter to his father dated November 12, 1778 wrote, "The piece I saw was Benda’s Medea. He has composed another one, Ariadne auf Naxos, and both are really excellent. You know that of all the Lutheran Kapellmeisters Benda has always been my favorite, and I like those two works of his so much that I carry them about with me." Although Mozart never wrote a full melodrama, he did create a miniature melodrama within his unfinished operetta, Zaide (1780), that is highly reminiscent of the style of Benda's Medea. Mozart’s imagination was much fired by Benda’s new vehicle for dramatic expression, and in 1778 he wrote to his father with the greatest enthusiasm about a project for composing a duodrama on the model of Benda’s Ariadne auf Naxos and Medea, both of which he considered excellent.

Roles

Discography
Medea (Melodrama) with conductor Christian Benda and the Prague Chamber Orchestra. Cast includes: Brigitte Quadlbauer, Hertha Schell, and Peter Uray. Released on the Naxos label in 1996.

References

External links
 Synopsis in German

1775 operas
German-language operas
Operas
Operas based on Medea (Euripides play)
Operas by Georg Benda
Melodramas